Shaun Baker, is an American actor and martial artist. He is best known for his role as Quick Williams on the  syndicated television series V.I.P.

Baker had a minor role in the 1990 Kid 'n Play film House Party.  In 1991, Baker appeared in In the Heat of the Night (the television series).  His first major television role was Malcolm on the ABC sitcom Where I Live, co-starring with Doug E. Doug and Flex Alexander.  After that series was cancelled, he landed the recurring role of womanizing Jamaican immigrant Russell Montego on the popular FOX sitcom Living Single.  He also guest starred on the TV show Family Matters (as Harriet Winslow's cousin "Easy C" Clarence Baines), CSI: Miami, The District, NYPD Blue, Martin, and A Different World.

From 1998 to 2002, Baker portrayed boxer-turned-private investigator Quick Williams on Pamela Anderson's campy action series V.I.P.  The show afforded Baker frequent opportunities to showcase his considerable martial arts skills.  He holds a first-degree black belt in Shotokan karate.

References

External links
 

Living people
African-American male actors
American male film actors
American male television actors
1974 births
21st-century African-American people
20th-century African-American people